Lebadea martha, the knight, is a species of nymphalid butterfly found in tropical and subtropical Asia.

Subspecies
Listed alphabetically.
L. m. attenuata Moore, 1878 (Burma)
L. m. distincta Corbet, 1942 (Mentawai Islands)
L. m. ismene (Doubleday, [1848])
L. m. malayana Fruhstorfer, 1902 – knight
L. m. martha Cambodia
L. m. moorei Hall, 1930
L. m. natuna Fruhstorfer, 1902 (Natuna Islands)
L. m. nebula Chou, Zhang & Xie, 2000
L. m. paduka (Moore, 1857) (northern Borneo)
L. m. parkeri Eliot, 1978 (Singapore)
L. m. sumatrensis Staudinger, 1886 (Sumatra)
L. m. wallacei Moore, 1898 (south-western Sumatra)

Gallery

References

  
 
 

Limenitidinae
Butterflies of Asia
Butterflies of Singapore
Butterflies described in 1787
Taxa named by Johan Christian Fabricius